Reality Is Not What It Seems: The Journey to Quantum Gravity is an illustrated book by Italian physicist Carlo Rovelli.
The book discusses quantum gravity. It was first published in Italian in 2014 (before the author's best-seller Seven Brief Lessons on Physics). It was published in English in 2016 by which time the English translation of Seven Brief Lessons had already appeared.

Structure 
The book's opening chapters trace the history and evolution of quantum gravity. Starting with pre-socratic philosopher Democritus through to the ideas of Sir Isaac Newton and, eventually, Albert Einstein, Rovelli puts forward a theory that quantum gravity brings great unity to the universe. Rovelli then states that space and time, waves and particles, energy and matter are all the same. Rovelli then seeks to disprove the concepts of continuity and infinity.

References

Italian non-fiction books
Popular physics books
2014 non-fiction books